The Way We Do is the only studio album by American contemporary R&B group Isyss, released September 26, 2002 via Arista Records. It peaked at number fifty-five on the Billboard 200.

Release and reception

The album peaked at fifty-five on the U.S. Billboard 200 and reached the twelfth spot on the R&B Albums chart.

While Dan LeRoy of Allmusic did state that the group "offer an appealing twist or two on the formulaic approach of their competitors," he also noted that the group had no particularly distinctive voices, remarking "without one, the way they do it sounds too much like the way everyone else does it, too."

Track listing

Chart history

Album

Singles

"—" denotes releases that did not chart.

Personnel
Information taken from Allmusic.
a&r – Joey Arbagey, Billy Moss
arranging – Kevin "She'kspere" Briggs
assisting – Steve Baughman, Chris DeLaPena, Brian Douglas
engineering – Kevin "She'kspere" Briggs, Andre Debourg, Tyrice Jones, Brian Springer
executive production – Billy Moss, L.A. Reid
guitar – Charles Fearing
instrumentation – Kevin "She'kspere" Briggs, Eric Johnson, Tyrice Jones
mastering – Herb Powers
midi – Kevin "She'kspere" Briggs
mixing – Steve Baughman, Kevin "KD" Davis
photography – Mike Ruiz
production – Kevin "She'kspere" Briggs, Chad Elliot, Christopher "Deep" Henderson, Chris Jennings, Eric Johnson, Tyrice Jones, Billy Moss, Doug Rasheed, Anthony Dent
programming – Chris Jennings, Tyrice Jones, Billy Moss, Victor White
pro-tools – Chauncey Mahan
remixing producer – Kevin "She'kspere" Briggs
track engineering – Doc Wiley
vocal engineering – Tyrice Jones
vocal production – Patrice "ButtaPhly" Stewart
vocals – LaMyia Good

Notes

External links
 
 The Way We Do at Discogs

2002 debut albums
Arista Records albums
Rhythm and blues albums by American artists